Ahearn Field was the first on-campus athletic field for Kansas State University in Manhattan, Kansas.  It was used from 1911 to 1922 by the football team, baseball team, and track team.  It was named in honor of former coach Mike Ahearn.

The field opened with a high school track competition held on April 15, 1911.

Before Ahearn Field, Kansas State's athletic teams used an open public square in Manhattan located at Bluemont Avenue and 8th Street, known informally as Athletic Park.  A covered wooden grandstand was built at the Athletic Park in 1906, along with a small locker room.  These structures were both transported to Ahearn Field in 1911 and used at the new site.  The grandstand was located at the south end of the field, facing north (approximately the current location of the K-State Alumni Center).

Memorial Stadium was opened at the same site in 1922, at which time the alignment of the football field was shifted from east–west to north–south, and the old grandstand was removed. As late as 1938 the new field was still referred to as Ahearn Field at Memorial Stadium.

References

Defunct college football venues
American football venues in Kansas
Kansas State Wildcats football venues
Kansas State University buildings
1911 establishments in Kansas
1921 disestablishments in Kansas
Sports venues completed in 1911
University and college buildings completed in 1911